The 1986 Coca-Cola 600, the 27th running of the event, was a NASCAR Winston Cup Series race held on May 25, 1986 at Charlotte Motor Speedway in Charlotte, North Carolina. Contested over 400 laps on the 1.5 mile (2.4 km) speedway, it was the 11th race of the 1986 NASCAR Winston Cup Series season. Dale Earnhardt of Richard Childress Racing won the race.

Background
Charlotte Motor Speedway is a motorsports complex located in Concord, North Carolina, United States 13 miles from Charlotte, North Carolina. The complex features a 1.5 miles (2.4 km) quad oval track that hosts NASCAR racing including the prestigious Coca-Cola 600 on Memorial Day weekend and The Winston, as well as the Oakwood Homes 500. The speedway was built in 1959 by Bruton Smith and is considered the home track for NASCAR with many race teams located in the Charlotte area. The track is owned and operated by Speedway Motorsports Inc. (SMI).

Summary
Brett Bodine made his NASCAR Winston Cup Series debut in this event. David Pearson makes his first appearance of the 1986 season in his next-to-last career start.

After this victory, Dale Earnhardt would go 15 races without getting a first-place finish.

Four of the drivers who failed to finish the race had crashed during the race. The rest of the drivers who failed to finish the race had problems with their camshaft, engine, shocks, head gasket and an overheating vehicle.

On the day of the race, 0.16 inches of precipitation were recorded around the speedway.

Top 10 results

Race statistics
 Time of race: 4:16:24
 Average Speed: 
 Pole Speed: 
 Cautions: 6 for 32 laps
 Margin of Victory: 1.59 seconds
 Lead changes: 38
 Percent of race run under caution: 8%         
 Average green flag run: 52.6 laps

References

Coca-Cola 600
Coca-Cola 600
NASCAR races at Charlotte Motor Speedway